Seely is a variation of the English and Anglo-Irish Sealy surname, and may refer to:

 Brad Seely (born 1956), American football coach
 Charles Seely (politician, born 1803) (1803–1887), British politician
 Sir Charles Seely, 1st Baronet (1833–1915), British industrialist and politician
 Sir Charles Seely, 2nd Baronet (1859–1926), British industrialist, landowner and politician
 Clinton B. Seely (born 1941), American academic and translator
 David Seely, 4th Baron Mottistone (1920–2011), British peer
 Horace Seely-Brown Jr. (1908–1982), American politician
 Hugh Seely, 1st Baron Sherwood (1898–1970), British politician
 J. E. B. Seely, 1st Baron Mottistone (1868–1947), British soldier and politician
 James M. Seely (1932–2017), American admiral
 Jeannie Seely (born 1940), American country music singer
 Tim Seely (born 1935), British movie and theatre actor
 Kelly Seely (born 1982), PhD, Senior Lecturer of Linguistics and Near-Eastern Literature

See also 
 Seely Township (disambiguation)
 Sealy (disambiguation)
 Sealey
 Seeley (disambiguation)